Escalada is a station on the Buenos Aires Premetro. It was opened on 29 April 1987 together with the other Premetro stations. The station is located in the Barrio of Villa Lugano, near the Parque de la Ciudad and Parque Indoamericano parks, a few meters away from the avenue that gives name to the station.

The station was formerly called Jumbo, however it was renamed in 2003 along with several other stations.

References

Buenos Aires PreMetro stations
Buenos Aires Underground stations
Railway stations opened in 1987